The 1952 Pepperdine Waves football team represented George Pepperdine College as a member of the California Collegiate Athletic Association (CCAA) during the 1952 college football season. The team was led by second-year head coach Duck Dowell and played home games at El Camino Stadium on the campus of El Camino College in Torrance, California. They finished the season with an overall record of 2–7 and a mark of 0–4 in conference play, placing last out of five teams in the CCAA.

Schedule

Notes

References

Pepperdine
Pepperdine Waves football seasons
Pepperdine Waves football